The Rangitaiki River is the longest river in the Bay of Plenty region in New Zealand's North Island.
The Rangitaiki catchment covers an area of 3005 km.
It flows in a generally northeastward direction, passing through the town of Murupara and skirting close to the western edge of Te Urewera National Park before turning northwards, flowing past Edgecumbe and into the Bay of Plenty close to Thornton.

There are two man-made lakes on the Rangitaiki formed by hydro-electric dams, Lake Āniwaniwa (formerly Lake Aniwhenua). and Lake Matahina.

History 
In April 2017, remnants of Cyclone Debbie caused heavy rainfall in the region. At 8:30 am on April 6, water from the Rangitaiki River breached the College Road floodwall at Edgecumbe, causing widespread flooding across the township. A state of emergency was declared for the Whakatane District, and around 2,000 people were evacuated to Kawerau and Whakatane.
More than 300 homes were damaged, with some becoming uninhabitable.
A review of the flood was undertaken by a panel consisting of Sir Michael Cullen (chair), Kyle Christensen, and Charlie Price.

Course 

The dam diverts all but at least 0.5 cumecs into the Wheao and Flaxy power scheme, which discharges into Wheao River which joins the Rangitaiki upstream of Murupara.

By the time it reaches the settlement at Murupara the river has a catchment of over 720 km.

The river then continues north over the Galatea Plains before it enters the man-made Lake Āniwaniwa, the waters of which power the Aniwhenua Power Station.

Below the power station the river passes over the Aniwhenua falls and then squeezes through a narrow chasm. Downstream of the dam, the main channel passes through a gorge and then out onto the Waiohau Plains and past the settlement of Waihau. Several small tributaries arising in the Ikawhenua Ranges cross the Waiohau Plains to join the Rangitaiki.

No major tributaries enter the river downstream of the Lake Matahina. Below Matahina the Rangitaiki passes the village of Te Mahoe and through a well-defined valley before crossing the 29,000 ha Rangitaiki Plains and passing the settlements of  Te Teko, Edgecumbe and Thornton. At Edgecumbe a large dairy factory owned by Fonterra discharges waste products into the river.

Watershed
Prior to the  completion of the Matahina Dam annual discharge figures for suspended and bed load sediment near the river mouth were about 201,000 and 188,000 tonne respectively, Since then the Matahina dam has acted as an effective barrier to the seaward movement of sediment by the Rangitaiki River, with equivalent post-dam values have dropped to 65,000 and 10,000 tonne.
This trapping of sediment has halted or substantially reduced the downstream historical rising river bed and coastal progradation of the Rangitaiki plains. 

The river's condition is monitored at Murupara, Aniwhenua and Te Teko.

River modifications
The arrival of Europeans in the area lead to draining of wetland and low-lying areas along the river  to create usable agricultural and horticultural lands. To support these activities the Rangitaiki Land Drainage Act was passed in 1910. One the Rangitaiki plains approximately 40,000 hectares of wetland was drained and converted to farmland. At the same time the existing dual discharges of the river towards the Whakatane River to the east  and the Tarawera River estuary to the west were replaced by the cutting of a channel near Thornton to provide a new direct outlet for the Rangitaiki to the sea. Within a day of the new outlet being opened in May 1914 the level of the Rangitaiki in the lower sections of the Rangitaiki Plains area dropped by approximately. This fall of the river level encouraged further agricultural and horticultural development in this area following the end of World War I.

The hydro-electric potential of the river has been utilized by the construction of the following generation stations:
Matahina Power Station: Commissioned in 1967 the associated 86 m high Matahina Dam has impounds the river to create Lake Matahina. Due to the lake's limited storage capacity  the power station operates as a run of the river scheme. The  power station can generate up to 80 MW.
The lake supports a regionally significant trout fishery, as well as duck shooting and other recreation activities. Due to the lake's limited storage capacity  the power station operates as a run of the river scheme. The power station can generate up to 25 MW.
Wheao and Flaxy Power Scheme: Located in the Kaingaroa forest this scheme was commissioned in 1980 and diverts water from the Flaxy Creek, Rangitaiki and Wheao rivers to power the 24 MW Wheao and the 2.1 MW Flaxy Power Stations. Due to the scheme's limited storage capacity it operates as a run of the river scheme.

Stopbanks
The development of flood control, mitigation schemes and drainage schemes  was undertaken u to the requirements of the Land Drainage Act 1908, Soil Conservation and Rivers Control Act 1941, and specificity for the Rangitaiki catchment  Rangitaiki Land Drainage Act 1910 and the Rangitāiki Land Drainage Act 1956.
To assist in controlling floods settlements and productive land downstream of Te Teko is protected by a system of stopbanks (also known as floodbanks). These are designed to provide protection from a 1% Annual Exceedance Probability (AEP) flood (also known as the “100 year” flood).

Tributaries 
Heading downstream from its source the river has the following tributaries:
Otamatea River.
Otangimoana Stream. Also known as Dry Fly Creek
Wheao River. This joins the Rangitaiki upstream of Murupara.
 Horomanga River. Like the Whirinaki this rises in the Ikawhenua Ranges and also contributes relatively large flood flows (and quantities of shingle) to the Rangitaiki. 
Haumea Stream.
 Whirinaki River. This river rises in the steep bush–covered Ikawhenua Ranges. Being composed of greywacke rock, with little absorption ability there is a resulting high runoff and so it consequently contributes relatively large flood flows (and quantities of shingle) to the Rangitaiki.
Mangamako Stream, 
Waihua Stream
Waikakopu Stream.
Pokairoa Stream.

Gallery

References

Further reading

External links 
Hydro-Electric Schemes Compliance Report June 2010 – June 2013.
Te Ika Whenua Rivers Report. This report issued by the Waitangi Tribunal in 1998 discusses the claims of the  Te Ika Whenua hapu over the Rangitaiki, Wheao, and Whirinaki Rivers and their tributaries. 
Rangitaiki River. Describes the fishing options on the river.
Rangitaiki River System, Horomanga and Whirinaki. Brochure produced by Fish and Game describing fishing options and access points on the river.

Rivers of the Bay of Plenty Region
Rivers of the Hawke's Bay Region
Rivers of New Zealand